The Jacob Leinenkugel Brewing Company, doing business as Leinenkugel's, is an American beer maker based in Chippewa Falls, Wisconsin. Leinenkugel was historically distributed only in the Upper Midwest, but is now available throughout all 50 states. The company is the seventh oldest brewery in the United States, and the oldest business in Chippewa Falls. It is a subsidiary of Molson Coors.  It produces both traditional beers, including lagers and ales, as well as a popular line of shandys, which are a mixture of beer with fruit juices, such as lemonade.

History
The brewery was founded in Chippewa Falls in May 1867 by Prussian immigrant Jacob Mathias Leinenkugel (1842–1899) and John Miller, making it the seventh oldest brewery in the United States. The original beer brewed, which historically made up 90% of company production, was based on a formula Leinenkugel brought with him from Germany. The company is the oldest operating business in Chippewa Falls.

Miller sold his stake in the company in 1884.

During Prohibition, the company produced near beer (known as "Leino") as well as soda water. With the repeal of Prohibition, Jacob Leinenkugel's daughters mortgaged their homes to fund the restoration of the company's beer brewing vats.

The Leinenkugel brewery expanded from its local roots beginning in the 1970s, when it first introduced its light beer. The family-owned brewery was sold in 1988 to Philip Morris subsidiary Miller Brewing Company in an effort to stay solvent. In an unprecedented move at the time, Miller kept the Leinenkugel family on to run its operation.

After several attempts to bring the beer to national U.S. markets, Miller succeeded in 2007 with the addition of a Summer Shandy ale to the Leinenkugel product line. The company has since become well known for its sweeter beers and shandies, with nine out of ten shandies consumed in the United States being brewed by Leinenkugel.

On October 11, 2016, SABMiller sold its stake in MillerCoors for around US $12 billion after the company was acquired by Anheuser-Busch InBev, making Molson Coors the sole owner of all Miller brands, including Leinenkugel's. As of 2016, the brewery has distribution outlets in all 50 states and its president is still a family member, Dick Leinenkugel.

For the company's 150th anniversary, it created a special, "old style" German beer, which was actually brewed by license in Germany via Hofbräu.

Breweries
Leinenkugel operates two breweries. The original, the company's base of operations, is located in Chippewa Falls; and the 10th Street Brewery located in Milwaukee, Wisconsin. The 10th Street Brewery (formerly the Valentin Blatz Brewing Company brewery), was opened in 1986 by G. Heileman Brewing Company for the Blatz label. It was purchased by Leinenkugel in 1995. It produces Leinenkugel's Big Eddy ale line, a series of seasonal, high alcohol beers.

Products 

As of 2019, beers produced by Leinenkugel's include:

Beers

Honey Weiss, wheat beer with honey
Sunset Wheat, wheat beer (fall seasonal)
Berry Weiss, wheat beer with berries
Creamy Dark, dark lager
Leinenkugel's Original, pilsner
Wisconsin Red Pale Ale, a pale ale
Leinenkugel's Light, a light beer
Canoe Paddler, a Kölsch (summer seasonal)
Oktoberfest, a Märzen (fall seasonal)
Snowdrift, a vanilla porter (winter seasonal)
Cherry Blonde Lager
Red Lager
Northwoods Lager

Shandys

Orange Shandy
Berry Shandy
Summer Shandy (lemon flavored)
Grapefruit Shandy
Watermelon Shandy
Pomegranate Shandy
Harvest Patch Shandy (pumpkin spice flavored, a fall seasonal)
Cranberry Ginger Shandy

See also
 Beer in Milwaukee

References

External links
Company website

SABMiller
Chippewa County, Wisconsin
Beer brewing companies based in Wisconsin
1867 establishments in Wisconsin
Food and drink companies established in 1867
American companies established in 1867